Enock Sabumukama (born 25 December 1995) is a Burundian football player. He plays in Zambia for ZESCO United.

Club career
He made his Burundi national football team debut on 15 July 2014 in a game against Kenya.

He was selected for the 2019 Africa Cup of Nations squad.

References

External links
 

1994 births
People from Ngozi Province
Living people
Burundian footballers
Burundi international footballers
Association football midfielders
ZESCO United F.C. players
Burundian expatriate footballers
Expatriate footballers in Zambia
2019 Africa Cup of Nations players